Postechiella is a  Gram-negative, strictly aerobic and non-motile genus of bacteria from the family of Flavobacteriaceae with one known species (Postechiella marina). Postechiella marina has been isolated from seawater from the beach of Damupo in Korea.

References

Flavobacteria
Bacteria genera
Monotypic bacteria genera
Taxa described in 2012